Jewish universities and colleges in the U.S. include:

 American Jewish University, formerly University of Judaism and Brandeis-Bardin Institute (merged), Los Angeles, California.
 Baltimore Hebrew University, now  Baltimore Hebrew Institute, Towson University, Maryland
 Bramson ORT College, New York City (closed)
 Chicago ORT Technical Institute, Skokie, Illinois (closed)
 Gratz College, Melrose Park, Pennsylvania
 Hebrew College, Newton Centre, Massachusetts
 Hebrew Union College-Jewish Institute of Religion, several locations in the United States
 Jewish Theological Seminary of America, New York City
 Karaite Jewish University, California (not accredited as an academic institution)
 Spertus Institute for Jewish Learning and Leadership, Chicago
 Touro College and University System, New York City
 Hebrew Theological College, Skokie, Illinois
 Lander College for Men, Queens, New York
 Touro Law Center, Long Island, New York
 Yeshiva University, New York City
Yeshiva College (Yeshiva University)
Stern College for Women
 Yeshiva of Greater Washington, Maryland

See also
Association of Advanced Rabbinical and Talmudic Schools
List of Jewish fraternities and sororities

References 

Jewish education in the United States
Jewish organizations based in the United States
Universities and colleges in the United States
Jewish universities and colleges in the United States